Phosphomevalonic acid is an intermediate in the Mevalonate pathway.

References 

Metabolism